The Sydney Track Classic is an annual outdoor track and field meeting held in February or March at the Sydney Olympic Park Athletic Centre in the suburb of Sydney Olympic Park in Sydney, Australia. It is part of the national Australian Athletics Tour, alongside the Melbourne Track Classic.

The history of the event emerged from a series of major athletics meetings which were held in the 1990s. The 1999 competition was the opening leg of the IAAF Grand Prix circuit and it formed part of the preparation towards the 2000 Sydney Olympics. The meeting was abandoned in 2002, but events hosted by the Sydney University Athletics Club and Athletics New South Wales saw the Sydney Track Classic restored in 2006.

By 2009 the competition was attracting top level domestic athletes (such as Steve Hooker and Sally McLellan) as well as a number of high-profile foreign athletes (including Asafa Powell, Melaine Walker, and Valerie Vili). The meeting was ranked first domestically for the level of performances that year. Hooker, Dani Samuels and Tero Pitkämäki provided the highlights of the 2010 edition, while Mitchell Watt and David Rudisha topped the bill in 2011.

In 2020 the meeting kicked off the inaugural World Athletics Continental Tour.

Meet Records

Men

Women

References

External links
Official website
Official website from Athletics Australia

Annual track and field meetings
Athletics competitions in Australia
IAAF Grand Prix
Sports competitions in Sydney